Tulukkat is a cape of the Anarusuk Island in the Upernavik Archipelago, Greenland. The cape is in the northwestern part of the island in the near of Qaqaarissorsuaq Island.

Anarusuk
Tasiusaq Bay